Sir Nicholas Markley Lloyd (born 9 June 1942) is a former British newspaper editor and broadcaster.

Early life 
Nicholas Markley Lloyd was born on 9 June 1942 in Luton, Bedfordshire, the son of Walter and Sybil Lloyd. He was educated at Bedford Modern School, St Edmund Hall, Oxford, and Harvard for the Advanced Management Program.

Career 
Lloyd started his career as a reporter at the Daily Mail in 1964. He was made Education Correspondent at The Sunday Times in 1966 and was made its Deputy News Editor in 1968.  In 1970 he moved to The Sun where he was made News Editor and, in 1972, became Assistant Editor at the News of the World.

In 1976, Lloyd returned to The Sun where he was made Assistant Editor before joining the Sunday Mirror in 1980 as Deputy Editor.
Lloyd edited the Sunday People from 1982 to 1983, then moved to edit the News of the World for a year from 1984, and finally edited the Daily Express from 1986 to 1995.

Lloyd received a knighthood in the 1990 Prime Minister's Resignation Honours. He presented a breakfast show on LBC 97.3, a London radio station, from 1997 to 1999. Since 2010, he has been the chairman of the public relations consultancy BLJ London.

Family life 
Lloyd married journalist Eve Pollard in 1979; the couple have a son, Oliver. He also has three children from his previous marriage: Justin, Rachael and James Lloyd. Pollard's daughter from a previous marriage, television personality Claudia Winkleman, is his step-daughter.

References

1942 births
Living people
People educated at Bedford Modern School
Alumni of St Edmund Hall, Oxford
British newspaper editors
British radio presenters
Place of birth missing (living people)
News of the World people
The Sunday People people
Daily Express people
Knights Bachelor